"Without You" is a song by German-based dance-pop group Sqeezer. It was released in Europe on 6 April 1998 as the sixth single and third song from their second studio album Streetlife (1998). All CD singles were manufactured in Holland and then Distributed by Cologne Dance Label and EMI Records before being discontinued sometime in 1998.

Track listing

 Europe CD-maxi
 "Without You" (Radio Video Single) – 3:39
 "Without You" (Mellow Guitar Vers.) – 3:39
 "Without You" (Extended Mix) – 5:11
 "Without You" (Groove Mood Mix) – 5:47
 "Boom Boom" – 2:25

 Europe (Fan Edition, Enhanced) 
 "Without You" (Radio Video Single) – 3:39
 "Without You" (US-Groove Remix) – 5:12
 "Without You" (House Remix) – 7:23
 "Without You" (Bonus Mix) – 4:04
 "Without You" (Mellow Guitar Vers.) – 3:39
Special edition Bonus videos
 "Without You" – 3:35

 Germany (Limited VIP Edition, Promo) 
 "Without You" (Radio Video Single) – 3:39
 "Without You" (Mellow Guitar Vers.) – 3:39
 "Without You" (Extended Mix) – 5:11
 "Without You" (Groovy Mood Mix) – 5:47

Charts

Weekly charts

Year-end charts

References

1998 singles
Sqeezer songs
1997 songs
Song articles with missing songwriters
Songs written by David Jost